Basciano is a town and comune in the province of Teramo, located in the Abruzzo region of east central Italy.

References

Cities and towns in Abruzzo